Ethelbert Patterson Oliphant was a judge of the Supreme Court of Washington Territory from 1861 to 1865. He graduated from Jefferson College (now Washington & Jefferson College).

References

1803 births
1884 deaths
People from Fayette County, Pennsylvania
Washington & Jefferson College alumni
Justices of the Washington Supreme Court
19th-century American judges